"First Time Caller"  is a song recorded by American country music artist Juice Newton.  It was released in July 1987 as the first single from the album Emotion.  The song reached #24 on the Billboard Hot Country Singles & Tracks chart.  The song was written by Reed Nielsen.

Charts

References

1987 singles
1987 songs
Juice Newton songs
Songs written by Reed Nielsen
Song recordings produced by Richard Landis
RCA Records singles